David Wagenfuhr (born June 22, 1982) is an American former soccer player, who retired at the age of 26, due to injury.

Wagenfuhr played four years of college soccer for Creighton University, where he was a standout player, being named first team All-Missouri Valley Conference three times. He also played in the USL Premier Development League for Boulder Rapids Reserve.

Wagenfuhr was drafted 31st overall in the 2004 MLS SuperDraft by the Dallas Burn.  Wagenfuhr saw no league playing time in his first year with the team. He became a starter in 2005. He scored his first career goal on July 8, 2006, against New York Red Bulls.

He retired from soccer in December 2008.

Career statistics

References 

1982 births
Living people
American soccer players
Colorado Rapids U-23 players
FC Dallas players
Milwaukee Rampage players
Creighton Bluejays men's soccer players
USL League Two players
Major League Soccer players
A-League (1995–2004) players
FC Dallas draft picks
Association football defenders
Sportspeople from Colorado Springs, Colorado
Soccer players from Colorado